Matthew Davenport Hill (6 August 1792 – 7 June 1872) was an English lawyer and prison reform campaigner and MP.

Life
Hill was born at Birmingham, where his father, Thomas Wright Hill, for long conducted the private schools Hazelwood and Bruce Castle. He was a brother of the postal reformer Sir Rowland Hill and the prison inspector Frederic Hill. He acted as assistant in his father's school, but in 1819 was called to the bar at Lincoln's Inn. In 1832 he was elected one of the Liberal Members of Parliament for Kingston upon Hull, but he lost his seat at the next election in 1834. On the incorporation of Birmingham in 1839 he was appointed as the town's recorder (judge); and in 1851 he was appointed commissioner in bankruptcy for the Bristol district. Taking an interest in questions relating to the treatment of criminal offenders, he publicly aired opinions which were the means of introducing many important reforms in the methods of dealing with crime, drawing notably upon the theories of the Scottish penal reformer, Alexander Maconochie. His book Mettray (1855) describes the Mettray Penal Colony with its then new approach to dealing with young delinquents.

One of his principal coadjutors in these reforms was his brother Frederic Hill (1803–1896), whose Amount, Causes and Remedies of Crime, the result of his experience as inspector of prisons for Scotland. marked an era in the methods of prison discipline. Hill was one of the chief promoters of the Society for the Diffusion of Useful Knowledge, and the originator of the Penny Magazine. He died at Stapleton, near Bristol.

In 1868 the West of England Suffrage Society, part of the National Society for Women's Suffrage, was formed at his house. His daughter Florence was one of the first members, and later members included Agnes Beddoe, Emily and Elizabeth Sturge.

Two of his daughters wrote an early biography in 1878.

Family
Hill married Margaret Bucknall on 3 November 1819. Their children were Alfred Hill (born 1821), Rosamond Davenport Hill (born in Chelsea in 1825), Florence Davenport Hill (also born in Chelsea in 1828), Matthew Berkeley Hill, and Joanna Margaret Hill (born in Hampstead in 1836/37).

Works
His principal works are:
Practical Suggestions to the Founders of Reformatory Schools (1855)
Suggestions for the Repression of Crime (1857), consisting of charges addressed to the grand juries of Birmingham
Mettray (1855)
Papers on the Penal Servitude Acts (1864)
Journal of a Third Visit to the Convict Gaols, Refuges and Reformatories of Dublin (1865)
Addresses delivered at the Birmingham and Midland Institute (1867).

See also

Rosamond Davenport Hill

References

External links

1792 births
1872 deaths
Penologists
People from Birmingham, West Midlands
Liberal Party (UK) MPs for English constituencies
UK MPs 1832–1835
National Society for Women's Suffrage
Committee members of the Society for the Diffusion of Useful Knowledge